The R403 road is a regional road in Ireland, linking the N4 at Lucan in County Dublin to Carbury in County Kildare. 

It starts, heading west, at a roundabout on the Leixlip Road (R148) and crosses the M4 motorway past Weston Airport and into County Kildare.

It follows the Dublin Road to Celbridge where it crosses the River Liffey with the R405, then heads southwest along the Clane Road to Clane. 

A  stretch of ruler-straight road takes it west via Prosperous to Allenwood. Its final stretch westwards is through the Bog of Allen via Derrinturn to Carbury, where it terminates at the R402

See also
Roads in Ireland
National primary road
National secondary road

References

Roads Act 1993 (Classification of Regional Roads) Order 2006 – Department of Transport

Regional roads in the Republic of Ireland
Roads in County Dublin
Roads in County Kildare